Shariati Metro Station is a station of Mashhad Metro Line 1. The station opened on 10 October 2011. It is located on Shari'ati Sq.. The station provides access to Qa'em and Emam Reza hospitals. The station also serves Mashhad Metro Line 2 and provide interchange between the two lines from 20 March 2018. On 7 May 2018 Iranian President Hassan Rouhani took part in the inauguration ceremony of the first Mashhad Urban Railway interchange station "Shariati" which connects line 1 and 2.

References

Mashhad Metro stations
Railway stations opened in 2018
2018 establishments in Iran
Railway stations opened in 2011
2011 establishments in Iran